Thapsia troglodytes is a species of air-breathing land snail, a terrestrial pulmonate gastropod mollusk in the family Urocyclidae. 

Thapsia troglodytes is the type species of the genus Thaspia.

Distribution
This species occurs in Gabon.

References

 Wronski, T., Gilbert, K., Long, E., Micha, B., Quinn, R. & Hausdorf, B. (2014). Species richness and meta-community structure of land snails along an altitudinal gradient on Bioko Island, Equatorial Guinea. Journal of Molluscan Studies. 80: 161–168.

External links
 Morelet, A. (1848). Testacea quaedam Africae occidentalis terrestria et fluviatilia. Revue Zoologique par la Société Cuvierienne. 11: 351-355

Thapsia